JSU may refer to:

All-Japan Seamen's Union
The IATA airport code for Maniitsoq Airport in Maniitsoq, Greenland
Jackson State University
Jacksonville State University
The Jewish Student Union
Jiangsu University
Juventudes Socialistas Unificadas (Unified Socialist Youth), an organisation during the Spanish Civil War
Jsu Garcia, actor